A. macrophylla may refer to:

 Adelphia macrophylla, a plant species found in South America
 Alseuosmia macrophylla, a plant species endemic to New Zealand
 Amphitecna macrophylla, a plant species found in Central America
 Aristolochia macrophylla, a plant species native to North America
 Asystasia macrophylla, a plant species found in Africa